The Citrus County Detention Facility is a privately operated jail located in Lecanto, Citrus County, Florida, run by the Corrections Corporation of America to house inmates for multiple jurisdictions:  the county, the United States Virgin Islands Department of Justice, and the U.S. Marshals Service.  The facility houses a maximum of 760 prisoners, both male and female, at mixed security levels.

References

Prisons in Florida
Buildings and structures in Citrus County, Florida
CoreCivic
1995 establishments in Florida